Randy Pietzman (born June 1, 1961) is an American politician. He is a member of the Missouri House of Representatives, having served since 2015. He is a member of the Republican Party.

Electoral history

State Representative

References

Living people
Republican Party members of the Missouri House of Representatives
1961 births
21st-century American politicians
People from Troy, Missouri